Krzysztof Adam Krajewski (born 3 August 1963, in Warsaw) is a Polish diplomat; ambassador to Azerbaijan (2005–2010), Bulgaria (2014–2018), and Russia (since 2021).

Life 
Krajewski has graduated from international relations at the University of Warsaw in 1987. Just after graduation he worked for the Office of the Council of Ministers.

In 1993, he joined the Ministry of Foreign Affairs of Poland. He was heading the Information Unit at the Department of Information and Promotion. From 1994 to 1998 he held the posts of deputy director and director of the Bureau of Human Resources. Between 1998 and 2003 he was serving as Consul-General in Varna. In 2005, he was advisor to the Marshal of Sejm. Following his directoral post at the Minister of Foreign Affairs Secretariat (2003–2005), in 2005 he was nominated Poland ambassador to Azerbaijan. He ended his term in 2010. and became director of the Diplomatic Protocol. On 28 July 2014, he was nominated Poland ambassador to Bulgaria, and presented his letter of credence on 9 August 2014. Ending his term on 30 September 2018, he returned to the post of the director of Diplomatic Protocol. In October 2020, he was unanimously accepted by both ruling and opposing parties of Polish Sejm as an ambassador to Russia. He had received the nomination in November 2020. He arrived to Moscow on 27 February 2021 and began his term officially on 4 March 2021. He handed his credentials on 18 May 2021.

Besides Polish, Krajewski speaks English, Bulgarian, German and Russian. He is married to Aldona Krajewska, with two children.

Honours 

 Gold Cross of Merit, Poland (1997)
 Honorary citizen of Varna (2002)
 Medal of the National Education Commission, Poland (2003)
 Dostlug Order, Azerbaijan (2010)
 Knight's Cross of the Order of Polonia Restituta, Poland (2011)
 Commander's Cross of the Order of Merit, Portugal (2012)
 Commander's Cross of the Order of Orange-Nassau, the Netherlands (2012)
 Commander's Cross of the Royal Norwegian Order of Merit, Norway (2012)
 Commander's Cross of the Order of the Three Stars, Latvia (2012)
 Commander's Cross of the Order of the Phoenix, Greece (2014)
 Order of the Cross of Terra Mariana, 3rd Class, Estonia (2014)
 Order of the Balkan Mountains, 1st class, Bulgaria (2018)
 Commander's Cross of the Order for Merits to Lithuania (2019)
 Officer's Cross of the Order of Polonia Restituta, Poland (2019)

References 

1963 births
University of Warsaw alumni
Ambassadors of Poland to Azerbaijan
Ambassadors of Poland to Bulgaria
Ambassadors of Poland to Russia
Commander's Crosses of the Order for Merits to Lithuania
Commanders of the Order of Merit (Portugal)
Commanders of the Order of Orange-Nassau
Commanders of the Order of the Phoenix (Greece)
Consuls-General of Poland
Knights of the Order of Polonia Restituta
Living people
Officers of the Order of Polonia Restituta
People from Varna, Bulgaria
Diplomats from Warsaw
Recipients of the Gold Cross of Merit (Poland)
Recipients of the Order of the Cross of Terra Mariana, 3rd Class